Cryptoblepharus renschi is a species of lizard in the family Scincidae. It is endemic to Indonesia.

References

Cryptoblepharus
Reptiles described in 1928
Taxa named by Robert Mertens
Reptiles of Indonesia
Endemic fauna of Indonesia